Şehzade Mehmed Ziyaeddin Efendi (26 August 1873 – 30 January 1938) was an Ottoman prince, eldest son of Sultan Mehmed V and his senior consort Kamures Kadın.

Early life
Şehzade Mehmed Ziyaeddin was born on 26 August 1873 in his father's villa in Ortaköy. His father was Mehmed V, son of Abdulmejid I and Gülcemal Kadın, and his mother was Kamures Kadın. When his father became heir to the throne in 1876, following the accession of his elder brother, Sultan Abdul Hamid II, the family moved to the apartment of the crown prince located in the Dolmabahçe Palace.

His circumcision took place on 17 December 1883, together with Şehzade Mehmed Selim, eldest son of Sultan Abdul Hamid II, Şehzade Ibrahim Tevfik, grandson of Sultan Abdulmejid I, and Abdulmejid II, Şehzade Mehmed Şevket and Şehzade Mehmed Seyfeddin, sons of Sultan Abdulaziz.

Education and career

Between 1911 and 1912, Ziyaeddin attended the Imperial War College. In February 1916, during the First World War he served as the honorary cavalry brigadier in the imperial army. He also served as honorary aide-de-camp to his father, Sultan Reşad.

After the death of Sultan Reşad in 1918, Ziyaeddin enrolled in Imperial Medical School. Safiye Ünüvar, tells in her memois that he used to bring his notebooks to her, and she would copy them out cleanly. He also took algebra lessons from her.

Public life
On 2 September 1909, Ziyaeddin travelled to Bursa with his father, Sultan Reşad, and brothers, Şehzade Mahmud Necmeddin and Şehzade Ömer Hilmi. On 13 June 1910, he and his brothers received Şehzade Yusuf Izzeddin at the Sirkeci railway station, when he came from his first visit to Europe. Between 5 and 26 June 1911, Ziyaeddin travelled to Rumelia with his father and brothers. 

On 11 November 1911, he traveled to Egypt to meet the King of United Kingdom George V and his wife Queen Mary of Teck, and stayed there until 29 November 1911. Between 4 and 5 November 1912, during the Balkan Wars, he visited the Çatalca front. Between 10 and 21 April 1917, during the First World War, he visited the German Empire.

On 15 October 1917, he met with the German emperor Wilhelm II, when the latter visited Istanbul in 1917. On 9 May 1918, he also met with the Emperor Charles I of Austria, when the latter visited Istanbul in 1918, with his wife Empress Zita of Bourbon-Parma.

Personal life
When Ziyaeddin came of age, Sultan Abdülhamid II, his father's half-brother, decided that he should marry Abdülhamid's daughter Naime Sultan. The wedding never took place because Ziyaeddin and his father rejected the proposal, but, curiously, a daughter of Ziyaeddin, Dürriye Sultan, married Naime Sultan's son, Sultanzade Mehmed Cahid Osman Bey.

Ziyaeddin's first wife was Perniyan Hanım. She was born on 2 January 1880.  They married on 5 January 1898, when she was eighteen. In 1900 she gave birth to Behiye Sultan. She was an accomplished calligrapher. When Sultan Reşad happened to notice a work of hers he showed it to one of the calligraphers of that time, who admired it greatly. She hoped to arrange for lessons in calligraphy through Sabit Bey, Sultan Reşad's Master of the Robes, however, court tradition proved an obstacle to her goals, and she had to remain content with having earned the sultan's admiration for her work. Later divorced, Perniyan died in 1947 at aged sixty seven.

Ziyaeddin's second wife was Ünsiyar Hanım. She was born in 1887. She was a Circassian. She was the daughter of Hüseyin Bey and Firdevs Hanım. 
She had one sister, Hacer Laverans Hanım (1900 – 1992). They married on 16 August 1903, when she was sixteen. Some two years later she gave birth to Dürriye Sultan, in 1905, followed by Rukiye Sultan in 1906 and Şehzade Mehmed Nazım in 1910. She was an intelligent and reasonable lady, and took a particular interest in the education of royal women. She died in 1934 in Alexandria, Egypt, aged forty seven.

Ziyaeddin's third wife was Perizad Hanım. She was born in 1889. A certain Vedat Bey was her paternal cousin. They married on 18 January 1907, when she was seventeen. In 1908 she gave birth to Hayriye Sultan, followed in 1910 by Lütfiye Sultan. She was known in the palace for her good nature and discretion. She died in the French Hospital in Alexandria, Egypt, in 1934, at the age of forty five, and was buried in the mausoleum of Prince Omar Tusun Pasha.

Ziyaeddin's fourth wife was Melekseyran Hanım. She was born on 23 September 1890. She had a sister, Sermelek Hanım. They married in 1911. The following year she gave birth to Şehzade Ömer Fevzi. She was beautiful but hadn't been educated well. Later divorced, she died in 1966 at the age of seventy six. Ziyaeddin's fifth wife was Neşemend Hanım. They married in 1920, after Ziyaeddin's divorce from Melekseyran. Later in 1923 she gave birth to Mihrimah Sultan. She died in 1934, at aged twenty nine, in Egypt, where she was buried at the city of Helwan.

Later life and death
Following the death of his father, Sultan Mehmed Reşad, Prince Ziyaeddin and his family moved to his villa located at Ibrahim Pasha Meadows, visiting Yıldız and 
Dolmabahçe Palaces only on high holidays and official occasions. The villa included three distinct units, each of three stories, so that each wife and her children could occupy their own quarters. Altogether the entourage of Prince Ziyaeddin and his wives totalled thirty-six persons.

Following the establishment of the Turkish Republic and the abolition of the Ottoman Sultanate and the Ottoman Caliphate, the entire Imperial Ottoman family were forced into exile in March 1924. Ziyaeddin and his family settled in Beirut, Lebanon. In 1926, they went to Alexandria, Egypt. In the years before his death, he sailed on a foreign ship and watched Istanbul from the deck, as he could not enter in Turkey. When he tried to disembark as a common tourist, he was taken back to the ship by the Turkish police. He died at the age of sixty four at Alexandria because tubercolosis on 30 January 1938 and was buried in the mausoleum of Khedive Tewfik Pasha, Cairo.

Personality
Ziyaeddin was always seen with his eccentric modes of dress, promenading his clothes and colourful shoes bidding goodday with the boldest of gestures to ladies.

He always kept up ties to the poorer classes and never refused them his assistance in any way, expending a part of his small income to help the needy people of Kadıköy and environs as well as Üsküdar. He paid for the burial of indigent persons, financially assisted penniless girls who were to be married, and requested his consorts to help in providing them clothing and other items. At the beginning of each month he would
distribute an allowance to the needy persons in the neighborhood, insofar as he was capable. Among the Kalfa (servants) in his service there was Nevzad Hanim, who would become the last consort of Sultan Mehmed VI, his father's younger half-brother.

Honours
Ottoman honours
 Order of Osmanieh, 1st Class, 1884; Jeweled, 26 March 1912
 Order of the Medjidie, Jeweled, 1909
 Liakat Medal, 17 October 1916
 Order of Glory, Jeweled, 2 May 1917
 Order of the House of Osman
 Hicaz Demiryolu Medal in Gold
 Ottoman War Medal

Foreign honours
 : Knight Grand Cross of the Royal Victorian Order, 21 November 1911
 : Order of Karađorđe's Star 
 : Grand-Cross of the Order of Leopold, 6 June 1918

Military appointments
Honorary military ranks and army appointments
 February 1916: Cavalry Brigadier, Ottoman Army 
 Aide-de-Camp to the Sultan

Issue
Şehzade Mehmed Ziyaeddin had two sons and six daughters.

Sons
Şehzade Mehmed Nazim (22 December 1910 - 11 November 1984) - with Ünsiyar Hanım. Born in Dolmabahçe Palace. He died at Istanbul, Turkey, and buried in tomb of Sultan Mehmed. He married twice:
In 1938 with Perizad Belkis Hanım. The marriage was not recognized by Caliph Abdülmecid II and was annulled in 1944. With her he had a son:
Şehzade Cengiz (b. 20 November 1939). He married three times:
Eileen Imrie (b.1946). They had a daughter and a son:
Ayşe Louise (b. 21 March 1964). Married with Bill Rehm, She had two daughters:
Peri Kathleen (b. 2 June 1994)
Zekeriya (b. October 1996) 
Mehmed Ziyaeddin (b. 18 April 1966). He married a European woman named Kelly.
Donna
Suzanne
In 1945 in Cairo with Halime Lima Hanim (16 June 1919 – 22 March 2000, Cairo, Egypt), granddaughter of Şeyh Ebülhuda Efendi. With her he had two sons:
Şehzade Hasan Orhan (b. 9 September 1946). He married twice:
Devlet Sue Tolestoa (b. 27 November 1957). Annulated in 1985.
On 9 September 1996 with Malak Seyfallah Ruşdi (b. 8 July 1960)
Şehzade Mehmed Ziyaeddin (b. 17 September 1947). He married twice:
On 4 September 1969 with Ghada Habjouga (b. 1 September 1952)
On 2 May 1984 with Allison Maddox (b. 4 December 1951). They had a son and a daughter:
Nazim (b. 24 September 1985)
Nermin Zoé (b. 30 March 1988) 
Şehzade Ömer Fevzi (13 November 1912 - 24 April 1986) - with Melekseyran Hanım. Born in Yıldız Palace. In 1946 in Cairo he married Mukaddes Hanim. After her death in 1958, he married Veliye Hanım in 1863. He had no children. He died in Amman, Jordan. Buried in the Mehmed V mausoleum.

Daughters
Behiye Sultan (8 November 1900 - 1950) - with Perniyan Hanim. Born in Dolmabahçe Palace, died at Alexandria, Egypt, and buried in tomb of Khedive Tewfik. She was married three times:
 On 6 April 1916, at Dolmabahçe Palace, she married Prince Kavalalı Ömer Halim Bey (1898-1954), son of Said Halim Paşah. The marriage was annulled on 4 November 1920.
 In 1921 at Göztepe Palace she married Cemâleddîn Bey. The marriage was morganatic because it was not recognized by Sultan Mehmed VI. The marriage was annulled in 1931. She had one son with him:
Sultanzade Reşad Bey (b.1930). He married a European woman named Jeanne. They had a son and a daughter:
Cengiz (b. 1972)
Sabrina (b. 1974)
 On 9 November 1934, she married Sertabib Hafız Zeki Bey. With him she had a son:
Sultanzade Ahmed Reşid Bey (b.1935). He married Ülfet Fadi (b. 6 February 1936). They had two sons and a daughter:
Mahmud Ahmad Raşid (b. 10 August 1958)
Mona Ahmad Raşid (b. 10 March 1962)
Muhammad Ahmad Raşid (b. 26 November 1966)
Dürriye Sultan (3 August 1905 - 15 July 1922) - with Ünsiyar Hanım. She married Sultanzade Mehmed Cahid Osman Bey, son of Naime Sultan. They divorced after a year. She died of tuberculosis the following year.
Rukiye Sultan (11 October 1906 - 20 February 1927) - with Ünsiyar Hanım. She married Sokolluzâde Abdülbâki Ihsân Bey in 1924. With him she had one daughter:
Behiye Emel Nuricihan Hanımsultan (b. 15 June 1925)
Hayriye Sultan (16 February 1908 - 5 March 1943) - with Perizad Hanım. Born in Dolmabahçe Palace, died of tuberculosis in Beirut. Buried in Tewfik Pasha mausoleum.
Lütfiye Sultan (20 April 1910 - 11 June 1997) - with Perizad Hanım. She married Hasan Bey in 1932. She had two sons and a daughter with him:
Sultanzade Ahmed Reşid Bey (7 May 1933 - 1958)
Sultanzade Reşad Bey (7 May 1934 - January 2014)
Perizad Hanımsultan (b. 11 January  1936)
Mihrimah Sultan (14 April 1923 - 30 March 2000) - with Neşemend Hanım. She married Prince Nâyef, one of the sons of King Abdüllah I of Jordan. She had two sons with him:
Prince Sultanzade Ali Bey (b. 10 August 1941)
Prince Sultanzade Abubakr Âsım Bey (b. 27 April 1948)

Ancestry

References

Sources

External links

 Family Tree, descendants of Sultan Mahmud II. Retrieved 2011-02-28.

1873 births
1938 deaths
Royalty from Istanbul
Ottoman Army generals
Ottoman princes